This is a  list of United Sikkim Football Club's managers and their records, from 2011, when the first professional manager was appointed, to the present day.

Statistics
As of 13 November 2012

Managers
 
United Sikkim